is a Japanese singer and former voice actress.  She formerly belonged to Gekidan Himawari. Her most noted voice role is that of Edward Wong Hau Pepelu Tivrusky IV in Cowboy Bebop. She also performed an insert song to the series, "Wo Qui Non Coin".

In March 2005, she signed on to Moon-Bunny Entertainment and began her singer-songwriting career. She has performed the theme songs for Gunslinger Girl: Il Teatrino and Angel Beats!. She is also affiliated with the group Veil. She is credited for her Veil-related songs as Veil ∞ Aoi.

As of 2005, she has retired from voice acting but is still active as a singer. However, she return back to voice in her spare time.

Discography

Singles
"Doll/Human" (Released 30 January 2008)
Split single with Lia, theme song for the Gunslinger Girl -Il Teatrino- anime series.
"Shirley" (Released 9 May 2008)
"My Soul, Your Beats!/Brave Song" (Released 26 May 2010) #3 on Oricon
Split single with Lia, theme song for the Angel Beats! anime series.
"Bravely You / Yake Ochinai Tsubasa" (Released 26 August 2015) #4 on Oricon
Split single with Lia, theme song for the Charlotte (anime) anime series.

Albums
Nanairo no Uta (Released 7 July 2006)
Sketchbook (Released 5 June 2009)

Other CDs
Cowboy Bebop Original Soundtrack 3: Blue (Released 1 May 1999)
"Wo Qui Non Coin"
Cowboy Bebop: Knockin' on heaven's door O.S.T. Future Blues (Released 29 August 2001)
"3.14"
CowBoy Bebop CD Box (Released 21 June 2002)
"Sasurai no Cowboy"
Digimon Tamers Best Tamers 3: Li Jianliang & Terriermon (1 August 2001)
Digimon Tamers Best Tamers 8: Li Shaochung & Lopmon (28 February 2002)
Genesis of Aquarion Original Soundtrack (Released 8 June 2005)
"Tori ni Natte"
Gunslinger Girl -Il Teatrino- Vocal Album (Released 23 April 2008)
"Scarborough Fair"
"Tsuioku ~Mori to Mizu no Uta~"
Rewrite Original Soundtrack Disc 3 (Released 28 October 2011)
"Watari no Uta" (arranged by ANANT-GARDE EYES)
"CANOE" (arranged by ANANT-GARDE EYES)
YOU and ME and HER: A Love Story -Song Collection- (Released 28 August 2013)
"Galactic Merry-Go-Round (Hoshi no Meriigoorando)"

Filmography

TV anime
Cowboy Bebop (1998), Edward Wong Hau Pepelu Tivrusky IV
Kindaichi Case Files (2000), Ogura Noeru
Digimon Tamers (2000), Terriermon, Lopmon
Digimon Ghost Game (2023) - Terriermon Assistant

Anime films
Cowboy Bebop: Knockin' on Heaven's Door (Edward Wong Hau Pepelu Tivrusky IV)
Digimon Adventure 02: Digimon Hurricane Touchdown/Supreme Evolution! The Golden Digimentals (Gummimon)
Digimon Tamers: Battle of Adventurers (Terriermon)
Digimon Tamers: Runaway Locomon (Terriermon, Lopmon)

Games
Cowboy Bebop (Edward Wong Hau Pepelu Tivrusky IV)
Cowboy Bebop: Tsuioku no Serenade (Edward Wong Hau Pepelu Tivrusky IV)
Sunrise Eiyūtan series (Run Forest, Edward Wong Hau Pepelu Tivrusky IV)
Digimon Rumble Arena (Terriermon)
Digimon New Century (Terriermon, Lopmon)

Theatre
Annie (Annie)
Algo Musical: Algo Hajimete no Bōken
Algo Musical: Hikari no Hashi wo Koete
Algo Musical: Ōgon no Shima
The Sound of Music
The Goodbye Girl

References

External links
 

1981 births
Living people
Japanese women pop singers
Japanese video game actresses
Japanese voice actresses
Anime musicians
Singers from Tokyo
Voice actresses from Tokyo
20th-century Japanese actresses
21st-century Japanese actresses
21st-century Japanese singers